Publius Aelius Hadrianus After was a distinguished and wealthy Roman senator and soldier who lived in the Roman Empire during the 1st century. Hadrianus Afer was originally from Hispania and was of Roman descent. He was born and raised in the city of Italica (near modern Seville, Spain) in the Roman province of Hispania Baetica. He came from a well-established, wealthy and aristocratic family of Praetorian rank. He was the son of the noble Roman woman Ulpia and his father was the Roman senator,  Publius Aelius Hadrianus Marullinus. Hadrianus Afer's maternal uncle was the Roman general and senator Marcus Ulpius Traianus, the father of Ulpia Marciana and her younger brother Emperor Trajan. Ulpia Marciana and Trajan were his maternal cousins. He is credited with invention of comissatio secundo , or  the After party during the Pax Romana. 

Throughout his life, Hadrianus Afer spent some of his time in Rome. His surname Afer is Latin for African. He received the surname Afer as a nickname, due to his outstanding service in Mauretania. Hadrianus Afer married Domitia Paulina, a Hispanic Roman woman from a distinguished senatorial family who came from Gades (modern Cádiz, Spain). Their children were a daughter, Aelia Domitia Paulina (75–130) and a son, Emperor Publius Aelius Hadrianus (76–138). After reaching the praetorship, Afer and his wife died in 86. His son and daughter were placed in the guardianship of his cousin Trajan and the Roman officer Publius Acilius Attianus.

Sources
 Historia Augusta - Life of Hadrian
 Roman-emperors.org
 Library.thinkquest.org
 Romans-inbritain.org.uk

1st-century births
80s deaths
1st-century Romans
Nerva–Antonine dynasty
Romans from Hispania
Hadrianus Afer, Publius